The 1992 Nigerian Senate election in Federal Capital Territory was held on July 4, 1992, to elect member of the Nigerian Senate to represent Federal Capital Territory. Hassan Asa Haruna Tadanyigbe representing FCT Senatorial District won on the platform of the Social Democratic Party.

Overview

Summary

Results

FCT Senatorial District 
The election was won by Hassan Asa Haruna Tadanyigbe of the Social Democratic Party.

References 

Fed
Federal Capital Territory Senate elections
July 1992 events in Nigeria